Tribhuvaneshwar Saran Singh Deo  or T. S. Singh Deo (born 31 October 1952) is an Indian politician from Ambikapur, Chhattisgarh, India. He is the current Health Minister of Chhattisgarh. 

He is also the current titular Maharaja of Surguja, with headquarters at Ambikapur. He was the last mentor to sit on the throne of Surguja. He is often referred to as "TS BABA" in his local constituency.

Political career
He is one of the most prominent and senior of Indian National Congress. Being from royal family, he is the richest MLA of Chhattisgarh.

He is a member of INC and was Leader of Opposition in 4th Vidhan Sabha of Chhattisgarh. Currently, he is serving as a Cabinet Minister for Health in the Chhattisgarh government.

He is an elected member of Chhattisgarh Assembly from Ambikapur (District Surguja) since 2008.

He has been a very active politician in demonstrating against the BJP government which helped him to bring his party to power with huge majority in Chhattisgarh Vidhan Sabha election of 2018. He is a gentle face of Congress in Chhattisgarh. He was the richest candidate in the 2013 Assembly Elections.

Terms in the Chhattisgarh assembly

References

External links
TS Singh Deo on Twitter
TS Singh Deo on Facebook

1952 births
Living people
Rajya Sabha members from Chhattisgarh
Indian National Congress politicians from Chhattisgarh
People from Ambikapur, India
Leaders of the Opposition in Chhattisgarh
Chhattisgarh MLAs 2018–2023
Chhattisgarh MLAs 2008–2013
Chhattisgarh MLAs 2013–2018